Keat Hong LRT station is an elevated Light Rail Transit (LRT) station on the Bukit Panjang LRT line in Choa Chu Kang, Singapore, located at the junction of Choa Chu Kang Way and Choa Chu Kang Avenue 1.

The name was picked as the station is located near the former Keat Hong Camp.

As of January 2017, Keat Hong station has Half-Height Platform Barriers installed at both platforms of the station.

Station details

Station design
The LRT station has the conventional barrel-roof design like the rest of the stations on the BPLRT.

References

External links

Railway stations in Singapore opened in 1999
Choa Chu Kang
LRT stations of Bukit Panjang LRT Line
Light Rail Transit (Singapore) stations